Hecatombaeon or Hekatombaion was a town of ancient Achaea in the territory of Dyme, between that city and the frontiers of Elis. In 224 BCE, near Hecatombaeon Aratus of Sicyon and the Achaeans were defeated by Spartan king Cleomenes III, who followed up his victory by gaining possession of Langon.

References

Populated places in ancient Achaea
Former populated places in Greece
Lost ancient cities and towns